As Suways may refer to:
Suez, a seaport town in Egypt
As Suways Governorate, a governorate of Egypt